Frederick Charles Tubby (born 23 January 1947) is a former Australian politician.

The son of Reg Tubby, also an MP, he was born in Morawa, Western Australia, and was a school principal before entering politics. In 1988 he was elected in a by-election to the Western Australian Legislative Assembly as the Liberal member for Dale, moving to the new seat of Roleystone the following year. In 1989 he was appointed Shadow Minister for the Family, Seniors and Consumer Affairs, exchanging Education for Family in 1990 and becoming simply Shadow Minister for Education in 1992. In 1993, following the Liberal election victory, he became a parliamentary secretary, which he remained throughout the two terms of Liberal government. He lost his seat in 2001.

References

1947 births
Living people
Liberal Party of Australia members of the Parliament of Western Australia
Members of the Western Australian Legislative Assembly
People from Morawa, Western Australia
21st-century Australian politicians